Panerai is an Italian company founded by Giovanni Panerai (1825–1897). 

It is also an Italian surname that may refer to:
Carla Panerai (born 1947), Italian sprint runner
Rolando Panerai (1924–2019), Italian singer
Ruggero Panerai (1862–1923), Italian painter
Umberto Panerai (born 1953), Italian water polo player